(born 1989) is a Japanese short track speed skater. She competed at the 2010 Winter Olympics in Vancouver. She won a bronze medal in 1500 metres at the 2011 Asian Winter Games.

References

1989 births
Living people
People from Sakai, Osaka
Japanese female short track speed skaters
Olympic short track speed skaters of Japan
Short track speed skaters at the 2010 Winter Olympics
Short track speed skaters at the 2014 Winter Olympics
Short track speed skaters at the 2011 Asian Winter Games
Asian Games medalists in short track speed skating
Asian Games bronze medalists for Japan
Medalists at the 2011 Asian Winter Games
21st-century Japanese women